The following were mayors of Bournemouth, Dorset, England, Before 1974, Bournemouth was in the county of Hampshire:

 Lewis Tregonwell, the founder of the town
1890 Thomas James Hankinson the first mayor
1891 Edward Wise Rebbeck
1892 Henry Newlyn
1893 George Merriman Hirons
1894 Merton Russell-Cotes
1895 Henry Newlyn
1896 James Atkinson Hosker
1897 William Mattocks
1898 William Hoare
1899 John Clark Webber
1900 George Joseph Lawson
1901 George Frost
19021904 John Elmes Beale
19051906 John Aldridge Parsons
19071909 George Edward Bridge
1910 Charles Hunt
19111913 Henry Seymour McCalmont Hill
1914 James Druitt
19151916 Henry Robson
19171918 Edward Ernest Bishop
19191922 Charles Henry Cartwright
1923 (part year) Thomas Bodley Scott (died in office)
1923 (part year)1924 Frederick Skinner Mate
19251927 Harry John Thwaites
1928 Sir Charles Henry Cartwright (4th term)
19291931 Percy May Bright
19321934 John Robert Edgecombe
1935 Henry George Harris
1936 Thomas Victor Rebbeck
1937 John Bennett Cole Beale
1938 Isaac William Dickinson
1939 Percy Wilfred Tom Hayward
1940 Alfred Herbert Little
1941 John James Empson
1942 Frank Bassett Summerbee
1943 Jabez Richards
1944 Harry Charles Brown
1945 Robert Charles Henry Old
19461949 John William Moore
1949 James Hugh Turner
1950 Sydney Arthur Thomson
1951 Frank James McInnes
1952 Harold Alfred Benwell
1953 Harry Percival Evelyn Mears
1954 George Smith
1955 Donald Nelson Willoughby
1956 Philip George Templeman
1957 Willliam James Whitelock
1958 Henry Brown
1959 Louis Victor Barney
1960 Mrs Bessie Bicknell (Bournemouth’s first woman Mayor)
1961 Deric Sidney Scott
1962 Alban Ernest James Adams
1963 Harry Percival Evelyn Mears
1964 (part year) Harold Alfred Benwell
1964 (part year) Harry Percival Evelyn Mears
1965 Reginald Sylvester Morris
1966 Philip Gordon Whitelegg
1967 Frank Alfred William Purdy
1968 Michael Willliam Green
1969 Basil Ewart David Beckett
1970 Edwin Alfred Lane
1971 Richard Ayton Judd
1972 Miss Leslie Mary Swetenham
1973 (to 30 March 1974) Major Bertram George Dillon
1974 (1 Apr – 24 May) William Frederick Forman
1974 William Thomas Roy Turner
1975 George Henry Masters
1976 Arthur William Patton
1977 Dr Gabriel Vivian Jaffé
1978 Frank Holmes Beale
1979 Patrick Walter Kelleway
1980 Ernest Norman Day
1981 Gordon Roy Anstee
1982 Mrs Sheila Elizabeth McQueen
1983 Mrs Jeanne Hilda Curtis
1984 Michael Harold Filer
198586 Robert Frederick Wotton
198687 Dan Crone
198788 Barbara R. Siberry
198889 Jacqueline Craven Harris
198990 Harry Bostock
199091 Wycliffe H Coe
199192 Lionel F Bennett
199293 Margaret Hogarth
199394 Ronald Whittaker
199495 Dr John Millward
199596 Pamela I Harris
199697 Jean Moore
Unitary Authority 1997
199798 Peter Brushett
199899 Keith Rawlings
199900 Hampton James Courtney
200001 Ben Grower
200102 Douglas Eyre
200203 David Baldwin
200304 Anne Rey
200405 Emily Morrell-Cross
200506 Ted Taylor
200607 Bob Chapman
200708 Anne Filer
200809 Stephen Chappell
200910 Beryl Baxter
201011 Barry Goldbart, the first Reform Jewish Mayor
201112 Chris Rochester
201213 Phil Stanley-Watts (Bournemouth’s 100th Mayor)
201314 Dr Rodney Cooper
201415 Chris Mayne
201516 John Adams
201617 Eddie Coope
201718 Lawrence Williams
201819 Derek Borthwick
201921 Susan Phillips, Due to the Covid-19 pandemic the mayoral term was given a year’s extension.
202122 David Kelsey
202223 Robert (Bob) Lawton

References 

Politics of Bournemouth
 Bournemouth
Bournemouth